Gonzalo Payo Subiza (10 January 1931 – 13 August 2002) was a Spanish politician from the Union of the Democratic Centre. He was elected deputy for Toledo to the first Congress of Deputies. He served as the second President of Castilla–La Mancha in 1982 before it gained autonomy.

References

1931 births
2002 deaths
People from Toledo, Spain
University of Zaragoza alumni
Union of the Democratic Centre (Spain) politicians
Members of the 1st Congress of Deputies (Spain)
Members of the 4th Cortes of Castilla–La Mancha
Members of the 5th Cortes of Castilla–La Mancha
Members of the Cortes of Castilla–La Mancha from Toledo